Znamya (lit. "The Banner") is a Russian monthly literary magazine, which was established in Moscow in 1931. In 1931–1932, the magazine was published under the name of Lokaf ("Локаф", which was an abbreviation of "Литературное объединение писателей Красной Армии и флота", or Literary Association of Writers of the Red Army and Fleet). During the Soviet times, Znamya dedicated most of its pages to short stories and novels about the military, publishing works by Konstantin Simonov, Vasily Grossman, Pavel Antokolsky and others. Znamya has different sections dedicated to prose, poetry, essays, literary criticism, bibliography etc. In 1972, the magazine had a circulation of some 160,000 copies.

In April 1954, the magazine published poems from the novel "Doctor Zhivago" by Boris Pasternak.

Since Perestroika, the magazine has a liberal orientation. It publishes traditional and innovative literature. The magazine published Anna Akhmatova, Mikhail Bulgakov, Osip Mandelstam, Andrei Platonov, Isaac Babel, Varlam Shalamov, Vasil Bykov, Joseph Brodsky, Evgeny Rein, Alexander Kushner, Natalya Gorbanevskaya, Olga Sedakova, Tatyana Tolstaya, Lyudmila Petrushevskaya, Viktor Pelevin, Victor Sosnora, Arkadii Dragomoshchenko and many other writers.

See also
List of literary magazines

References

External links
 

1931 establishments in the Soviet Union
Magazines established in 1931
Magazines published in Moscow
Literary magazines published in Russia
Literary magazines published in the Soviet Union
Russian-language magazines
Monthly magazines published in Russia